Guillermo Velásquez (born 10 December 1944) is a Chilean boxer. He competed in the men's bantamweight event at the 1968 Summer Olympics.

References

External links
 

1944 births
Living people
Chilean male boxers
Olympic boxers of Chile
Boxers at the 1968 Summer Olympics
People from Osorno, Chile
Pan American Games medalists in boxing
Pan American Games bronze medalists for Chile
Boxers at the 1967 Pan American Games
Bantamweight boxers
Medalists at the 1967 Pan American Games
20th-century Chilean people
21st-century Chilean people